The coastline of the Russian Federation is the fourth longest in the world after the coastlines of Canada, Greenland, and Indonesia. The Russian fishing industry has an exclusive economic zone (EEZ) of 7.6 million km2 including access to twelve seas in three oceans, together with the landlocked Caspian Sea and more than two million rivers.

According to the FAO, in 2005 the Russian fishing industry harvested 3,190,946 tonnes of fish from wild fisheries and another 114,752 tonnes from aquaculture. This made Russia the ninth leading producer of fish, with 2.3 percent of the world total.

Management
Fisheries management is regulated by Russian federal laws. The federal law "On Fisheries and Protection of Aquatic Biological Resources" of December 2004 (referred to below as the Law on Fisheries) divides fisheries into three main categories" industrial, recreational, and subsistence fisheries of indigenous groups. Industrial fisheries includes coastal fisheries. This definition has been challenged and is under review.

The Law on Fisheries requires that total allowable catch (TAC) levels are set for fishery stocks. It defines these levels as the "scientifically justified annual catch of aquatic biological resources of particular species in a fishing area". However, the Law on Fisheries then goes on to state that industrial fisheries are not necessarily required to base their catch on TAC. The law does not explain this further, but calls for the federal government to issue a special TAC setting statute. Pacific salmon is the main stock that will probably not have TAC, but will have regulated fishing effort instead.

The Law on Fisheries also gives a definition of a fishing unit area and sets general principles for their use. The compiling of lists of fishing unit areas is delegated to the regional authorities. The Law on Fisheries has gaps and its application is criticized by parliamentarians and stakeholders. It may be expected that in the coming years at least two new federal laws, "On Coastal Fisheries" and "On Aquaculture", will be considered by Russian legislators.

Apart from TAC settings, fisheries are also regulated by the so-called Fishing Rules (Pravila rybolovstva). These rules are set separately for different geographical regions.

The Fishing Rules specify seasonal closures, closed areas, restrictions on specific gears such as restricting mesh sizes, minimum catch sizes, and restricted levels of allowable bycatch. Fisheries management has been changing since Soviet times, and further changes are likely.

The government has mismanaged the fisheries, with frequent restructuring of the institutions responsible for fishery management and control. Starting in 1992, the fishery authority has been reorganized at least five times. The head of the fishery authority was replaced seven times, and not one of these heads was a fishery professional. The issues involved in regulating fishing capacity were never really recognized. However, consistent fishery policies are starting to be developed now.

The extreme bureaucracy involved for a fishing vessel to make a port call and land fish results in coastal processing being bypassed. Instead, the seafood is just directly exported, unprocessed. Similarly, there are many bureaucratic difficulties in developing aquaculture. Getting a licence to use water and the necessary sanitary certificates is very time-consuming, although it does guarantee environmental and health safety. Ships built, purchased, or serviced outside of the Eurasian Economic Union face significant restrictions in landing catches caught in Russia's EEZ, and from 2022 will not be allocated any fishing quotas in Russian waters.

Artisanal

There is no legally adopted term in Russia for artisanal fisheries. Artisanal or subsistence fishing usually refers to fishing mainly with traditional gear, with production delivered to the market but also used for subsistence. In Russia, the term covers also several kinds of fisheries classified as industrial, such as salmon, chars, whitefish, navaga, flounders and greenling fisheries in the Baltic, the Arctic and the Far Eastern Seas. Subsistence fishing by indigenous groups is also an issue. Indigenous fishers mainly work estuaries, lagoons and rivers (for anadromous fish). Legally, they are bound to use their catch for local consumption only. They are not allowed to sell their catch, but in reality, this is not always the case.

In Russia, poverty contributes to poaching and other threats to fishery resources. Poverty can leave people depending on natural resources to feed themselves. There may be little perceived incentive to protect fish and other aquatic life and to use them in a sustainable way. Lack of awareness and lack of public involvement in managing local resources can result in poaching, overfishing, and other kinds of illegal activities. Poaching by private individuals feeds the industrial IUU catch, and forms a vicious cycle.

The social impacts of traditional fisheries has rarely been analysed. The yearly fishing cycle still dominates life in the traditional fishing villages of the Pomor, dotted around the coast of the White Sea. Fishing has similarly influenced the life style of many indigenous groups, such as among settlers around the Pacific Coast, north of Siberia, and around the big lakes. In the late 1960s, administrative decisions were made to abandon many coastal villages and resettle people in larger settlements. This has disrupted the traditional ways and is associated with alcohol abuse and increased poverty. There is now a slow movement towards reviving cultural traditions. To succeed, there must also be a re-establishment of the sustainable fisheries that allowed such fishing communities to flourish.

Recreational
Recreational fishing occurs everywhere in Russia. The Fishing Rules do not distinguish recreational fishing from artisan fishing, so both are regulated under the same rules. In some areas, tourist fishing is growing.

In 1999, recreational and subsistence fishers took 4,300 tonnes, mostly perches and cyprinids. Later estimates are not available. The most significant recreational fishery by value is the Kola Peninsula Atlantic salmon fishery.

Commercial
Russia has three main commercial fisheries:
 marine fisheries – including brackish water and anadromous species, and estuarine fisheries
 inland fisheries
 aquaculture

Wild fisheries

EEZ

Russia's marine fisheries are based on twelve seas from three oceans which surround Russia, the landlocked Caspian Sea, and the high seas beyond Russia's exclusive economic zone (EEZ).

The three oceans are:
 the Atlantic: with the Sea of Azov, Black Sea, Baltic, Barents Sea and White Sea
 the Arctic Ocean: with the Kara Sea, Laptev Sea, East Siberian Sea and Chuckchi Sea
 the Pacific: with the Bering Sea, Sea of Okhotsk and Sea of Japan.

Marine capture fisheries in Russia's territorial seas, internal marine waters and the EEZ provided up to 75 percent of the total reported catch for 1996–2005.

Catch profile
The officially recorded annual value of fisheries is about US$5 billion, equivalent to 0.3 percent of GDP. The fishery sector has been stable in absolute terms in recent years, so its share of GDP has reduced as the general economy has expanded.

Due to the decreasing catch and a growing export to East Asian markets, Russian fisheries cannot meet current domestic demand for seafood. East Asian markets are more attractive to fishing enterprises than the domestic market. As a consequence, there are increasing imports for the affluent in big cities, with increasing subsistence and recreational fishing with its associated  IUU catch.

Coastal fisheries

High seas fisheries

Inland fisheries

The biggest inland water is the landlocked Caspian Sea. The biggest lakes are Baikal (31,700 km2), Ladoga (19,100 km2) and Onega (9,700 km2). Russia has more than 2 million rivers, the largest of which are, in order, Severnaya Dvina, Pechora, Dnieper, Volga, Ob', Don, Yenisei, Lena, Kolyma, Indigirka and Amur. The most important inland fishing area is the Ob'–Irtysh River Basin (about 27 percent). Sixty species are caught in the inland fisheries of Russia. In volume terms, whitefish (Coregonidae), cyprinids, zanders and perch are most important. Set nets are the most common gear used in inland water commercial fisheries. Seines are also used on big rivers and lakes, and small trawls on the big lakes. In 2005, the official catch in the inland waters was 72,000 tonnes.

In the past, sturgeon has been an important catch in the basin of the Sea of Azov and the Caspian Sea, and in Siberian Rivers and the Amur River. Currently, sturgeon stocks are heavily depleted and under constant pressure from poaching. Inland fisheries are regulated by the Law on Fisheries discussed above. However, few provisions refer specifically to inland fisheries, although there are specific regulations for same catchments and river systems. These regulations specify closed areas, seasonal closures, gear restrictions, minimum mesh sizes and minimum catch size.

Fishing fleet

According to the Russian State Marine Register, in 2002, the offshore fishing fleet contained about 2,500 fishing vessels, 366 transport vessels and 46 factory ships. Of the fishing vessels, 17 percent were longer than 64 metres (o/a), half were between 34 and 64 metres, and one-third were between 24 and 34 metres. Smaller boats are registered with the State Inspection of Small Size Fleet. In 2005, the marine small size fleet contained 2,491 boats, and the inland fleet contained 5,500 motor boats.

Fishing gears used are:

 Midwater trawls – used by processing trawlers and freezing for redfish and Alaska pollock.
 Bottom trawls – restricted use by medium and large sized trawlers, for demersal fishes such as halibut, cod, redfish, flounder.
 Shrimp trawls – used by specialised shrimp trawlers
 Bottom nets – used by small and midsize vessels for flounder, cod and halibut
 Bottom seines – deployed by small vessels for flounder, cod, halibut and other demersal fishes.
 Drift nets – used by midsize vessels, mainly for salmon.
 Bottom longlines – used for halibut, cod and redfish.
 Traps and pots – used by small and midsize vessels for shrimp, crabs and whelks,
 Seines and pound nets – for herring and whitefish
 Dredges – operated from small vessels for clams.
 Small boats –  used with salmon kiddles (basketwork traps), and for skindivers harvesting scallops, sea urchins, kelp and sea cucumbers.

An important issue is the age of the Russian fishing fleet. About two-thirds of the fishing vessels do not conform to safety norms. Compared to 1990, by 2000 capital investment in the industry had decreased thirty percent and the number of specialists qualified in fishing, navigation and processing technologies had decreased 30 to 40 percent. The Barents Sea cod fishery is an example of the dominance of elderly and ineffective vessels. Between 2002 and 2005, forty percent of effort in the demersal fishery was by elderly freezing trawlers, which produced only twenty-five percent of the official catch. That is, they were 1.5 times less effective than the other vessels in the fleet. Equivalent modern trawlers are three to four times as effective. The low efficiencies of these elderly vessels also implicates them in involvements with IUU catch.

Decline of stocks
According to the FAO, important stocks have declined as the result of:
 natural fluctuations: Pacific pilchard
 a combination of natural fluctuations and overfishing: Atlantic and Pacific herring, Alaska pollock, capelin in the Barents Sea
 overfishing and continuing IUU: sturgeons, Atlantic salmon, red king crab, sea cucumber
 a combination of marine pollution and overfishing: whitefish and Atlantic salmon in the Pechora drainage basin, whitefish and sturgeon in the Ob drainage basin, most of the stocks in the Amur Basin
 ecosystem transformation due to the introduction of invasive species: sprat in the Black and the Caspian Seas.

Aggravating factors surround the demand for seafood from East Asian markets, which encourage commercial fishermen to exhaust stocks in Russia's EEZ. Russian illegal exporters have well oiled links to importers in Japan, China and South Korea. Criminal groups and corruption magnifies the effect, as the short distances needed to transport seafood from south Kurils and south Sakhalin to Japan. Huge fish processing developments in China built on cheap labour encourage the export of further unprocessed fish.

Aquaculture
Over sixty species of fish, invertebrates and seaweed are commercially cultivated by aquaculture or fish farming in Russia. Aquaculture is based mainly on buffalo, grass and silver carp, rainbow trout, scallops, mussels and laminaria. In 2007 there were 300 aquaculture enterprises.

Aquaculture can be freshwater or marine (mariculture):

 Freshwater aquaculture – occurs northwest of European Russia where a lot of trout are farmed, in the Far East, and south of Siberia. Production 2003 to 2006 was about 100,000 tonnes.
 Mariculture –  occurs mainly in Primorye Province on the coast of the Sea of Japan. In 2006, marine farms in Primorye covered 10,000 hectares, which produces  1,340 tonnes, mainly of Laminaria, blue mussel and the scallop Mizuhopecten yessoensis.

Potential development areas for freshwater aquaculture include 960,000 hectares of agricultural water bodies, 143,000 hectares of ponds, plus other areas in big lakes and water reservoirs suitable for cage farming. The National Project on Agricultural Sector development (Federal Agency of Fishery, 2006) has set a target for 2020 of 1.4 million tonnes from freshwater aquaculture and 400 thousand tonnes from mariculture. The federal government is considering a subsidy of two-thirds of the credit needed to construct and modernise aquaculture facilities.

Research
In Soviet times, the Ministry for Fishery Industry operated many institutes which undertook comprehensive research in oceanography, marine biology, the assessment of fishery resources, fishery management regimes, and the technology of fishing gear and fish processing. The Ministry also operated research ship on the high seas to meet the needs of Russian distant water fisheries.

After the breakup of the Soviet Union, these institutes, basically responsible for research in fisheries science, were coordinated by VNIRO, the central fishery institute in Moscow.

In 2007, the regional institutes became formally subordinate branches of VNIRO. Notably, the GIPRORYBFLOT in St. Petersburg researches the technology of fishing vessels and fish processing, while the VIERH in Moscow does economic research.

Education
Five technical universities are geared to train specialists in fisheries. There are programmes for fisheries biology, navigation and marine engineering, fish processing, processing machinery, the economics of fisheries and aquaculture. Four professional schools graduate middle level professionals.

Nine universities graduate about 120 aquaculture specialists each year. The biological departments of several universities also graduate specialists in fish biology and fishery oceanography.

The institutes that are traditionally of most importance are the St. Petersburg Hydrometeorological Institute, the geographical departments of St. Petersburg and Moscow universities, the biological department of Moscow State University,  the Far Eastern National University, Kazan State University and Perm State University.

Maps

See also

 Agriculture in Russia
 Agriculture in the Russian Empire
 Agriculture in the Soviet Union
 Continental shelf of Russia
 Whaling in the Soviet Union and Russia

Notes

References

External links
 Pacific Rim Fisheries: Russian Federation, the Far East
Fishnet Russia - Business directory and trade leads portal
Russian Fish Industry

Fishing in Russia